Jenette Kahn (born May 16, 1947) is an American comic book editor and executive.  She joined DC Comics in 1976 as publisher, and five years later was promoted to president. In 1989, she stepped down as publisher and assumed the title of editor-in-chief while retaining the office of president. After 26 years with DC, she left the company in 2002.

Early life
Jenette Kahn grew up in Boston. Her father was a rabbi. Her brother, Si Kahn, is a singer-songwriter and activist. She was an avid comics fan, a practice supported by her parents, with particular favorites being Batman, Superman, Little Lulu, Uncle Scrooge, and Archie.

Career
After graduating from Radcliffe College with a degree in art history, Kahn eventually founded three magazines for young people. The original publication, Kids, was entirely written by children for one another. Its subject matter included drug abuse, diversity, animal protection, and the environment. Kahn's second magazine was Dynamite, for Scholastic Inc. Kahn followed with Smash for Xerox Education Publications.

DC Comics 
Kahn was 28 years old on February 2, 1976, when she became publisher of DC Comics, a division of Warner Bros. and home to over five thousand characters, including Superman, Batman and Wonder Woman. Sol Harrison served as the company's president. Kahn stated in a 2012 interview that "I can't really say that Sol and I had much of a working relationship. He, more than anybody, resented my being hired because he felt that the job [of publisher] was rightfully his." In February 1981, she became president following the retirement of Harrison. She was the youngest person in the company to become president of a division, and the first woman. Furthermore, before Kahn began her new position, she was instrumental in dissuading the head of Warner Publishing from simply ending National's publishing in favor of simple license maintenance, and kept it a going concern.

To mark her new direction for the company, Kahn officially renamed National Periodical Publications to DC Comics, complete with a bold new company logo, nicknamed the DC Bullet, designed by Milton Glaser. Furthermore, she moved to centralize editorial from its individual fiefdoms to place the characters in a more interactive DC Multiverse with a more systematic approval process for the artistic staff to produce fewer and commercially sounder titles. To that end, Kahn sought to hire young staff to revitalize the content such as an unsuccessful attempt to recruit Marvel Comics mainstay artist, John Buscema, and a successful recruitment of major Marvel writer, Steve Englehart. Later in her administration, Kahn's recruitment goals became easier for the fact that Marvel Comics' Editor-in-Chief, Jim Shooter, was proving alienating to much of his company's creative staff and they consequently proved receptive to Kahn's offers including major talents like Roy Thomas, Gene Colan, Marv Wolfman, and George Perez.

Kahn initiated the "DC Explosion" of new titles and formats which was followed in 1978 by a company downturn referred to as the "DC Implosion.  Along with editor and executive vice president Paul Levitz and managing editor Dick Giordano, Kahn then revitalized the company through the remainder of the decade and the 1980s, including the introduction of "Dollar Comics" publications, as well as limited series to allow for more flexible arrangements for the talent. Kahn supported creators' rights in an industry in which royalties and other traditional publishing rights were not the norm, thus giving the talent a stake in the commercial success of their work that the industry's traditional work-for-hire arrangements never encouraged. In 1989, she assumed the title of editor-in-chief while retaining the office of president but stepped down as publisher.

Kahn oversaw the launch in 1993 of the Vertigo imprint and of Milestone Media, a minority-founded and ethnically diverse line of comic books that DC published for several years and from which Static Shock, the animated show on The WB television network, was developed. Kahn is credited with overseeing a successful period of reinvention for DC's classic characters, including the death and rebirth of Superman. Giordano commented that Kahn had no editorial restrictions on creators, as far as he could tell. Under Kahn's leadership, DC became known for pushing boundaries in subject matter by addressing issues of domestic violence, sexual orientation, gun violence, homelessness, racism, and AIDS in the company's mainstream titles. One exception to this editorial stance was Kahn cancelling an issue of Swamp Thing where the title character interacts with Jesus, which led to the writer and artist Rick Veitch quitting, citing censorship concerns.

She oversaw a diversification of the originally overwhelmingly male staff at DC, to the point where when she left, almost half the employees were women. Kahn left DC Comics in 2002 after 26 years with the company to pursue a career as a film producer.

Double Nickel Entertainment 
Kahn is a partner in Double Nickel Entertainment, a film production company she co-founded with Adam Richman after leaving DC Comics. Double Nickel's first film was The Flock (2007) starring Richard Gere and Claire Danes and directed by Andrew Lau. Its second was Gran Torino (2008), starring Clint Eastwood, who also directed.

In addition, Kahn serves on the boards of Exit Art and Harlem Stage, and is an advisor to The Bill T. Jones/Arnie Zane Dance Company. She is a founding member of The Committee of 200, a nationwide forum of key women in business. Her first book, In Your Space, was published by Abbeville Press in 2002.

Awards
Kahn received the Library of Congress Living Legends award in the "Writers and Artists" category in April 2000 for her significant contributions to America's cultural heritage. She received an Inkpot Award in July 2010.

President Ronald Reagan honored Kahn for her work on drug awareness, and she has been honored by the Clinton Administration, Secretary of State Madeleine Albright, the United Nations, and the Department of Defense for her work on land mines.

The FBI honored Kahn for her efforts on gun control, as did former Governor Douglas Wilder of Virginia, who credited her with helping to pass stricter gun control legislation in his state. She was honored by the World Design Foundation for outstanding creative achievements.

Kahn created The Wonder Woman Foundation in honor of Wonder Woman's 40th Anniversary. In its three years of existence, the foundation contributed more than $350,000 in grants to women over 40 in various categories.

Bibliography 
  In Your Space: Personalizing Your Home and Office (Abbeville Press, 2002),

References

External links 

 
 
 
 Kimball, Kirk. "Explosion and Implosion," part one of "Secret Origins of the DC Implosion," Dial B for Blog 
  at the Chicago Humanities Festival, December 4, 2013
 Jenette Kahn Video produced by Makers: Women Who Make America

1947 births
20th-century American businesspeople
20th-century American businesswomen
21st-century American businesspeople
American business executives
20th-century American Jews
American magazine publishers (people)
American women business executives
Businesspeople from Pennsylvania
Comic book editors
Comic book publishers (people)
DC Comics people
Inkpot Award winners
Living people
Radcliffe College alumni
American women editors
American female comics artists
21st-century American businesswomen
21st-century American Jews